Al-Alam is an arabophone Moroccan daily newspaper.

History and profile
Al Alam was founded in September 1946. The paper, based in Rabat, is the organ of the nationalist Istiqlal party. The party also publishes  L'Opinion.

During the mid-1970s the paper was frequently banned by the Moroccan authorities together with its sister publication, L'Opinion, and Al Muharrir, another oppositional paper.

The 2001 circulation of Al Alam was 100,000 copies, making it the second largest daily in the country. It was 18,000 copies in 2003.

See also
 List of newspapers in Morocco

References

External links
 Official website

Newspapers published in Morocco
Newspapers established in 1946
1946 establishments in Morocco
Arabic-language newspapers
Mass media in Rabat